The women's javelin throw event at the 2006 World Junior Championships in Athletics was held in Beijing, China, at Chaoyang Sports Centre on 15 and 19 August 2006.

Medalists

Results

Final
19 August 2006

Qualifications
15 August 2006

Group A

Group B

Participation
According to an unofficial count, 23 athletes from 17 countries participated in the event.

References

Javelin throw
Javelin throw at the World Athletics U20 Championships